Melipotis nigrobasis is a species of moth in the family Erebidae. It is found in North America.

The MONA or Hodges number for Melipotis nigrobasis is 8602.

References

Further reading

 
 
 

Melipotis
Articles created by Qbugbot
Moths described in 1852